Empire Celt was an  tanker which was built in 1941 for the Ministry of War Transport (MoWT).

Description
Empire Celt was built by Furness Shipbuilding Ltd, Haverton Hill-on-Tees, as yard number 335. She was launched on 7 October 1941 and completed in December.

She had a GRT of 8,032 and a NRT of 4,664.

The engine was built by Richardsons, Westgarth & Co Ltd, Hartlepool.

History
Empire Celt was placed under the management of Jas. German & Co Ltd, Middlesbrough. Her port of registry was Middlesbrough. The United Kingdom Official Number 164861 and Code Letters BCWD were allocated.

Empire Celt was a member of Convoy ON 67, which departed Milford Haven, Pembrokeshire on 13 February 1942 bound for North America. Empire Celt was on a voyage from Greenock to New York. She was in ballast. Four crew and two DEMS gunners were killed. Although she had been damaged, Empire Celt continued her voyage. Another attack at 09:50 by  failed, with the torpedo aimed at Empire Celt hitting  instead. Empire Celt later broke in two, with the bow section sinking. The Canadian ship  rescued 23 survivors, and  rescued 22 survivors. They were landed at St. John's, Newfoundland on 22 February. The stern section was considered salvageable, and the tug Foundation Franklin was despatched on 9 March to assist but failed to find any trace of Empire Celt and she was presumed to have sunk at position . Those lost on Empire Celt are commemorated at the Tower Hill Memorial, London.

References

1941 ships
Ships built on the River Tees
Tankers of the United Kingdom
Empire ships
Ministry of War Transport ships
World War II tankers
Steamships of the United Kingdom
Maritime incidents in February 1942
Ships sunk by German submarines in World War II
Shipwrecks in the Atlantic Ocean